Joseph Whiting Stock (January 30, 1815 – 1855) was an American painter known for his portraits, miniatures, and landscape paintings, many of which he did on commission. He was born on January 30, 1815, in Springfield, Massachusetts.

When Stock was eleven years old, an oxcart fell on him and he was paraplegic for the rest of his life. After this accident, he began to study painting under Franklin White, a pupil of the painter Chester Harding, on the advice of his physician, and was commissioned to do a series of anatomical drawings by Dr. James Swan in 1834. That year, Dr. Swan constructed a wheelchair which enabled Stock to paint large canvasses and be lifted on trains so as to travel for commissions. For the next two decades Stock accepted commissions for portraits around New England, working in Warren and Bristol, Rhode Island, New Bedford, Massachusetts, and Middletown, Goshen, and Port Jervis, New York. His studios were located in his hometown of Springfield throughout this time.

In 1855, Stock died of tuberculosis in Springfield. He was forty years old.

Stock's paintings are sometimes confused with those of Clarissa Peters Russell, the miniaturist, as her style is similar to his but her work tends to be unsigned.

References

External links
 Finding Aid for the Juliette Tomlinson Research Files on Joseph Whiting Stock The Frick Collection/Frick Art Reference Library Archives.
 National Gallery of Art collection
 Metropolitan Museum portrait

1815 births
1855 deaths
Painters from Massachusetts
Artists from Springfield, Massachusetts
19th-century American painters
19th-century American male artists
American male painters
People with paraplegia
19th-century deaths from tuberculosis
Folk artists
American portrait painters
Tuberculosis deaths in Massachusetts